Ignacio Antonio Bahamondes (born August 27, 1997) is a Chilean mixed martial artist who competes in the Lightweight division of the Ultimate Fighting Championship. He was the former Lux Lightweight Champion.

Background
Born and raised in Santiago, Chile, he followed his father's, who was a former South American WKN kickboxing champion, footsteps into kickboxing. After a successful amateur kickboxing career, he moved to United States at the age of 16 to pursue a career in mixed martial arts, settling in Miami speaking no English and alone.

Mixed martial arts career

Early career
During the early career Bahamondes racked a record of 10–3 in both North and Latin America regional circuit, claiming the Lux Fight League Lightweight Championship on the way.

Dana White's Contender Series
Bahamondes was invited to compete at Dana White's Contender Series 34 against Edson Gomez on November 4, 2020. He won the bout via second-round knockout and was awarded a contract with the UFC.

Ultimate Fighting Championship
Bahamondes faced John Makdessi on April 10, 2021, at UFC on ABC 2. At the weigh-ins, Ignacio Bahamondes weighed in at 156.75 pounds, 0.75 pound over the lightweight non-title fight limit. The bout proceeded at a catchweight and Bahamondes was fined 20% of his individual purse, which went to Makdessi. Bahamondes lost the bout via split decision.

He made his sophomore appearance in the organization against Roosevelt Roberts at UFC on ESPN 29 on August 21, 2021. He won the fight via knockout five seconds before the ending bell in the third round. The finish earned him a Performance of the Night bonus award.

Bahamondes faced Rong Zhu at UFC Fight Night: Makhachev vs. Green on February 26, 2022. He won the bout via submission in the third round.

Bahamondes was scheduled to face Ľudovít Klein on July 30, 2022, at UFC 277.  However, Bahamondes pulled out on July 15, 2022.

Bahamondes is scheduled to face Nikolas Motta on April 8, 2023, at UFC 287.

Championships and accomplishments
Ultimate Fighting Championship
Performance of the Night (one time) 
Lux Fight League
Lux Lightweight Championship (one time; former)

Mixed martial arts record

|-
|Win
|align=center|13–4
|Rong Zhu
|Submission (brabo choke)
|UFC Fight Night: Makhachev vs. Green
|
|align=center|3
|align=center|1:40
|Las Vegas, Nevada, United States
|
|-
|Win
|align=center|12–4
|Roosevelt Roberts
|KO (spinning wheel kick)
|UFC on ESPN: Cannonier vs. Gastelum
|
|align=center|3
|align=center|4:55
|Las Vegas, Nevada, United States
|
|-
|Loss
|align=center|11–4
|John Makdessi
|Decision (split)
|UFC on ABC: Vettori vs. Holland
|
|align=center|3
|align=center|5:00
|Las Vegas, Nevada, United States
|
|-
|Win
|align=center|11–3
|Edson Gomez
|KO (front kick)
|Dana White's Contender Series 34
|
|align=center|2
|align=center|2:31
|Las Vegas, Nevada, United States
|
|-
|Win
|align=center|10–3
|Chris Brown
|Decision (split)
|LFA 90
|
|align=center|3
|align=center|5:00
|Sioux Falls, South Dakota, United States
|
|-
|Loss
|align=center|9–3
|Salvador Becerra
|Decision (unanimous)
|Combate 50
|
|align=center|3
|align=center|5:00
|Fresno, California, United States
|
|-
|Win
|align=center|9–2
|Hugo Flores
|Decision (unanimous)
|Lux Fight League 4
|
|align=center|5
|align=center|5:00
|Mexico City, Mexico
|
|-
|Win
|align=center|8–2
|Javier Reyes
|TKO (body kick and punches)
|Lux Fight League 3
|
|align=center|1
|align=center|2:53
|Mexico City, Mexico
|
|-
|Win
|align=center|7–2
|Gerardo Chaparro
|TKO (punches)
|Combate Extremo: Loco vs. Gallito
|
|align=center|2
|align=center|3:59
|Monterrey, Mexico
|
|-
|Win
|align=center|6–2
|Francisco Javier Etchart Diaz
|KO (punch)
|Champions Nights Challengers 3
|
|align=center|1
|align=center|1:20
|Zacatecas, Mexico
|
|-
|Win
|align=center|5–2
|Oziel Rodriguez Lopez
|Decision (unanimous)
|Combate Extremo: Flores vs. Baltazar
|
|align=center|3
|align=center|5:00
|Monterrey, Mexico
|
|-
|Loss
|align=center|4–2
|Matt McKeon
|Submission (rear-naked choke)
|Island Fights 40
|
|align=center|1
|align=center|3:08
|Pensacola, Florida, United States
|
|-
|Win
|align=center|4–1
|Rafael Carolino
|KO (head kick)
|Guerra Campal 3
|
|align=center|1
|align=center|3:01
|Santiago, Chile
|
|-
|Win
|align=center|3–1
|Dion Rizzuto
|TKO (punches)
|Island Fights 38
|
|align=center|1
|align=center|1:03
|Pensacola, Florida, United States
|
|-
|Loss
|align=center|2–1
|Preston Parsons
|Submission (armbar)
|Titan FC 39
|
|align=center|1
|align=center|2:59
|Coral Gables, Florida, United States
|
|-
|Win
|align=center|2–0
|Rodrigo Tavares
|KO
|Island Fights 37
|
|align=center|1
|align=center|1:03
|Pensacola, Florida, United States
|
|-
|Win
|align=center|1–0
|Craig McAlpine
|KO (punch)
|Island Fights 36
|
|align=center|1
|align=center|2:31
|Pensacola, Florida, United States
|

See also 
 List of current UFC fighters
 List of male mixed martial artists

References

External links 
  
  

1997 births
Living people
Chilean male mixed martial artists
Lightweight mixed martial artists
Mixed martial artists utilizing kickboxing
Ultimate Fighting Championship male fighters